Painted Ruins is the fifth studio album by American rock band Grizzly Bear, released on August 18, 2017, by RCA Records. Along with the announcement of the album, the band announced a fall European and North American tour.

Recording
Grizzly Bear spent two years writing and recording for the album. Band member Chris Taylor produced Painted Ruins, with recording sessions occurring primarily at Allaire Studios in New York, but also at various locations around Los Angeles, including Taylor's own Terrible Studios.

Release
Prior to the release of the first single from the album, the band uploaded a series of mysterious teaser videos to their YouTube account.

On May 4, 2017, the first single from the album, "Three Rings", was released. The song was officially released at midnight in each successive time zone across the globe, and was later uploaded to their YouTube channel.

On May 17, Grizzly Bear revealed the name and release date of the upcoming album, and also announced their first tour in four years, beginning in Dublin, Ireland on October 5, and continuing through the end of the year, with concerts in Europe and North America.
Later that same day, Grizzly Bear released the second single from the album, "Mourning Sound".

On June 23, the band released the third track from the record, "Four Cypresses".

On July 21, the band released the fourth single from the record, "Neighbors".

Critical reception

Painted Ruins has received acclaim from music critics. At Metacritic, which assigns a normalized rating out of 100 to reviews from mainstream critics, the album has an average score of 82 out of 100, which indicates "universal acclaim" based on 29 reviews.

Laura Snapes in The Observer described the album as "Unbeholden to the band’s existence, Painted Ruins has a cavalier quality that you’d struggle to spot in its tense forebears".

Accolades

Track listing

Personnel
Credits:
Christopher Bear – drums, percussion, synths, vocals, drum programming, wurlitzer, pedal steel
Edward Droste – vocals
Daniel Rossen – vocals, guitars, piano, synths, organ, cello
Chris Taylor – vocals, bass, saxophones, clarinet, flute, bass harmonica, synths, drum programming

Charts

References

2017 albums
Grizzly Bear (band) albums
RCA Records albums
Albums produced by Chris Taylor (Grizzly Bear musician)